The 2018 Virginia Cavaliers men's soccer team represented University of Virginia during the 2018 NCAA Division I men's soccer season.  The Cavaliers were led by head coach George Gelnovatch, in his twenty-third season.  They played home games at Klöckner Stadium.  This was the team's 78th season playing organized men's college soccer and their 66th playing in the Atlantic Coast Conference.

In addition, the Cavaliers were one of the six college soccer programs that participated in U.S. Soccer's 2018 Spring Men's College Soccer Program, which was held from March 4–April 21. This will be a series of competitive fixtures that use IFAB rules instead of NCAA rules for matches.

Previous season 

The 2017 Virginia Cavaliers team finished the season with a final overall record of 13–4–5, and final ACC record of 3–2–3. The Cavaliers were seeded sixth-overall in the 2017 ACC Men's Soccer Tournament, where they reached the final. In the ACC Championship Game, they lost on penalty kicks to Wake Forest. The Cavaliers earned an at-large bid into the 2017 NCAA Division I Men's Soccer Tournament, continuing their record streak of consecutive NCAA appearances going at 37 appearances. In the NCAA Tournament, Virginia was seeded 11th overall in the tournament, where they reached third round before losing to Fordham.

At the end of the season, four Cavaliers men's soccer players were selected in the 2018 MLS SuperDraft: Jeff Caldwell, Edward Opoku, Pablo Aguilar and Sheldon Sullivan.

Offseason

Departures

Incoming transfers

2018 recruiting class

Roster 

Source:

Schedule 

|-
!colspan=7 style=""| U.S. Soccer Spring Men's College Program

|-
!colspan=7 style=""| Exhibition
|-

|-
!colspan=7 style=""| Regular Season
|-

|-
!colspan=7 style=""| ACC Tournament

|-
!colspan=7 style=""| NCAA Tournament

Statistics

Disciplinary record

Awards and honors

2019 MLS Super Draft

Virginia did not have any players selected in the 2019 MLS SuperDraft.

Rankings

References

External links 
Virginia Soccer

Virginia Cavaliers men's soccer seasons
Virginia Cavaliers
Virginia Cavaliers men's soccer team
Virginia Cavaliers
Virginia